Burt L. Saunders (born November 7, 1948) is a registered Republican and a former member of the Florida Senate, representing the 37th District since 1999.
 Previously he was a member of the Florida House of Representatives from 1994 through 1998.

In 2008 Saunders ran for the United States House of Representatives in Florida's 14th District with no party affiliation. He lost, finishing third in the four-way general election, receiving 14.7% of the vote. However, Saunders was one of the top 5 candidates to run for the United States House without any political party in 2008. Saunders was elected to the Collier County Commission in 2016. He previously served on the Collier County Commission from 1986 to 1994.

References

External links
Florida State Legislature - Senator Burt Saunders official government website
Project Vote Smart - Senator Burt L. Saunders (FL) profile
Follow the Money - Burt L Saunders
2006 2004 2002 2000 1998 campaign contributions

|-

|-

Republican Party Florida state senators
Republican Party members of the Florida House of Representatives
1948 births
Living people